Darjeeling Carnival is a ten-day carnival arranged in the town of Darjeeling, West Bengal, India.

The carnival consists of several functions like poetry-reading sessions, painting and photo exhibitions, tea-drinking ceremonies, a Land Rover rally, music concerts and ethnic food festivals. The Carnival was started by a group of young people in Darjeeling known as the "Darjeeling Initiative", and its main purpose was to get over the violent agitation in the eighties amongst the youth of Darjeeling. The carnival is usually held in the month of November every year. Darjeeling being famous with local Rock Bands, the music concerts are especially popular among the people.

An important enhancement to Darjeeling Carnival, an annual 10-day cultural event held in Darjeeling India  was the participation of the Russian Cultural Centre, which staged an exhibit of Nicholas Roerich reproductions along with a photographic exhibit highlighting the cultural links between India and Russia. Master artist Nicholas Roerich long considered the most significant cultural link between India and Russia spent some of his most creative working years in Darjeeling in the 1920s which gives this hill town an important place in this scenario. The exhibition was displayed along the Mall so that everybody could enjoy it and had a tremendous response, from its estimated well over 40,000 viewers.

Since time immemorial, people of Kolkata have had a special place in their hearts for Darjeeling. The sweet nostalgia of family holidays in the hills or the legends of children who have been educated here have created an unbroken bond between Kolkata and Darjeeling, their Queen of the Hills. Darjeeling Festival will be the celebration of this special relationship.

The Eastern Zonal Cultural Centre has graciously consented to support the efforts in promotion of our local cultural heritage.

Cultural Presentations
The Darjeeling Hills, located in the "Great Himalayan Cultural Fault Line" enjoy an exotic mix of cultures. People in the Darjeeling Hills are of varied ethnicity and who have lived in perfect harmony. The festival will showcase the best of cultural traditions in the performing arts of the region.

Food Court
The various ethnic cuisines of the hills and traditional beverages will be prepared and offered at the venue.

Tea Festival
Darjeeling, home to the 'Champagne of teas' has long been a Mecca for tea lovers and the Darjeeling Festival will celebrate the magic of tea.  To educate and expose people to the tradition of tea, the event will include tasting sessions, display and a mini-exhibition on the history and culture of tea.

Hills in Harmony
Music is one of the binding factors of the community of the Darjeeling Hills. The region has over the years, been the breeding ground for a succession of acclaimed music talents - many of whom have achieved worldwide fame, and the Festival will proudly present a sample of this aspect of the Darjeeling hill's culture.

Darjeeling Montage
The scenic precincts of the Darjeeling Hills, its colourful populace and the much revered Kanchenjunga continues to inspire many, and has been the setting for the creation of many acclaimed works by reputed talents in the visual arts over the last 150 years. Art, photography and sculpture from the Darjeeling Hills under a singular setting, showcasing local talent from this region, will be a special component of the Darjeeling Festival.

Complementing the Darjeeling Montage will be the exhibition on ‘Naturescapes’ by the Russian masters Nicholas and Svetoslav Roerich including prints of several of the masterpieces executed at Darjeeling and the photo exhibition on Indian and Russian landscapes, ‘Unity in Diversity’.

Heritage on Steam
Darjeeling Himalayan Railway is the first world heritage railway of the country. The DHR mini-exhibition will highlight the unique engineering feat of the Railway and its potential impact on socio-economic life of a mountain community.

Interaction and Networking
The Darjeeling Festival will be a natural setting for interactions between a range of stakeholders connected to the Darjeeling Hill Areas in many ways. These will include fields as varied as the hospitality industry, travel trade, tea industry, NGOs, alumni of Darjeeling schools and colleges, artists, writers and well wishers of the Darjeeling Hills

The Darjeeling Initiative ( Promoters of The Darjeeling Carnival )

The Darjeeling Initiative is a group of like-minded locals, mostly in their youth, from diverse backgrounds, coming together with the aim to make a positive impact on the socio-economy of the Darjeeling Hills. The group includes development workers, businessmen, hotel and restaurant owners, tour operators, lawyers, doctors, professionals, college students and unemployed youth. 
The majority of this group consists of people who lost a major part of their teenage and youth on account of the violent separate statehood agitation that rocked Darjeeling in the late 1980s. Today, almost 20 years later, the group believes it's time to move on, by pro-actively working towards a better Darjeeling Hills.

The Darjeeling Initiative very strongly believes that the issues facing Darjeeling Hills can be dealt with at the citizen's level by partnering with the government. With the pro-active involvement of the local administrative bodies the group is working on building a civil society movement where the local citizens, government and non-government agencies and business establishments come together to work towards a better society.

The Darjeeling Initiative is actively involved in a wide range of activities in the rural and urban areas of the Darjeeling Hills essentially centred upon pro-active community mobilisation and include among others, livelihood issues, disaster preparedness, drug abuse and HIV-AIDS awareness, community celebrations and heritage awareness.

The most significant of its community mobilisation exercises however, has been the central role played by the Darjeeling Initiative in the organisation of the 10 day Darjeeling Carnival, which made its spectacular debut run in November 2003.

The Darjeeling Carnival has gone from strength to strength over the years and has now strongly established itself as the most significant cultural event in the Eastern Himalayan Region and an important annual event in the nation's calendar, for its celebration of the unique and exotic multi-culture of the mountain people, to spread their message of innate cheer in the present strife-torn world.
The Darjeeling Carnival, with the high quality portrayal of the rich musical and cultural heritage of Darjeeling Hills as its central theme, is today one of the biggest community celebrations in Darjeeling's history, demonstrating the potentials and possibilities of collective and pro-active community motivation and mobilisation in making the Darjeeling Hills a better place for all.

The first UK Darjeeling Tea Festival was held in London in August 2013. The proceeds from the festival went to various charities in Darjeeling.
YouTube link:
https://www.youtube.com/watch?v=sJVInXa1v0w

See also 
 Chowrasta

Notes

Darjeeling
Carnivals in India
Culture of West Bengal